Kemal Kirişci  is the TÜSİAD senior fellow and director of the Center on the United States and Europe's Turkey Project at The Brookings Institution, with an expertise in Turkish foreign policy and migration studies. Until recently, he was a professor at the Department of Political Science and International Relations at Boğaziçi University, Istanbul. He holds a Jean Monnet Chair in European Integration and is also the director of the Center for European Studies at the University. He has previously taught at universities in Great Britain, Switzerland, and the United States. Kirişci received his Ph.D. at City University in London in 1986.

Bibliography

Books

Articles and chapters

Critical studies and reviews of Kirişci's work
Turkey and the West

References

Living people
Academic staff of Boğaziçi University
Year of birth missing (living people)